Museum of Ethnology is a museum located in Lake Egret Nature Park, Tai Po Kau, Tai Po District, Hong Kong.

Transport
The museum is accessible within walking distance South East of Tai Po Market station of the MTR.

See also
 List of museums in Hong Kong

External links

 Museum of Ethnology website

Museums in Hong Kong
Ethnographic museums in Asia
Tai Po